Kimberley Kates (born August 15, 1969) is an American actress and film producer. Kates is best known for her role as Princess Elizabeth in Bill & Ted's Excellent Adventure. She founded and is currently the CEO of Big Screen Entertainment Group, a Los Angeles-based publicly traded film production and distribution company.

Career 
Kates started her acting career when she was 15, her movie debut came in Bill & Ted's Excellent Adventure playing Princess Elizabeth, the film starred Keanu Reeves, Diane Franklin, Alex Winter, and George Carlin.

As an actress and prior to becoming a full-time film producer, Kates starred in more than 40 films and television shows. Her credits include television shows such as Seinfeld, The Larry Sanders Show, Charmed, Growing Pains, Murder She Wrote, On Our Own, Sucker, and films such as Bill & Ted's Excellent Adventure, Dangerous Love, Rescue Me, Chained Heat II, The New Age, Bounce and Highway.

As a producer, she has worked in several credits including, Dirty Love, Babysitter Wanted, William Shatner's Gonzo Ballet, Ramy Malek's Papillon and Bruce Willis' Air Strike.

In 1995, Kates collaborated with Michael Manasseri and established a film production and distribution company, which was renamed Big Screen Entertainment Group (OTC: BSEG) in August 2005, a publicly traded firm with its headquarters in Los Angeles.

Filmography

References

External links
 Big Screen Entertainment Group

Living people
American film actresses
American film producers
American television actresses
People from California
1969 births
American women film producers
21st-century American women